Pembroke Pines is a city in southern Broward County, Florida, United States. The city is located 22 miles (35 km) north of Miami. The population of Pembroke Pines was 171,178 at the 2020 census. It is a suburb of and the fourth-most populous city in the Miami metropolitan area, which was home to an estimated 6,012,331 people in 2015.

History

Pembroke Pines was officially incorporated on January 16, 1960. The city's name, Pembroke Pines, is traced back to Sir Edward J. Reed, a member of Britain's Parliament for the County of Pembroke from 1874 to 1880, who in 1882 formed the Florida Land and Mortgage Company to purchase from Hamilton Disston a total of 2 million acres of mostly swampland located throughout the southern half of Florida. A road put through one of the tracts came to be known as Pembroke Road. When incorporating the city, Walter Smith Kipnis, who became the city's first mayor, suggested the name Pembroke Pines because of the pine trees growing near Pembroke Road.

The first inhabitants of the area were American Indians, who first appeared about 4,000 years ago. Skeletal remains of animal hunters dating back about 10,000 years were found around Broward County, showing that perhaps human beings had lived in the area even earlier.

The town started as agricultural land occupied by dairy farms, and grew after World War II as service members were retiring, including large eastern sections that were part of the Waldrep Dairy Farm, including the present-day Pembroke Lakes Mall. The first two subdivisions were called Pembroke Pines. One of the first homes in the city belonged to Kipnis, the city's first mayor, and was built in 1956. It was then known as the "Village of Pembroke Pines" and was incorporated into a village in 1959. Builders contested the incorporation, so a legal battle ensued concerning the boundaries of the new municipality. City services were added in the 1960s with the building of the first fire department building near North Perry Airport. University Drive was then the western edge of habitable land for residents.

In January 1960, Pembroke Pines held another election, and the village became a city. This small property was less than a square mile and was between Hollywood Boulevard and SW 72nd Avenue, and had the Florida Turnpike to the east. Pembroke Pines sought to give citizens involvement, so they organized the Pembroke Pines Civic Association. The square-mile city was unable to expand due to North Perry Airport and the South Florida State Hospital. Joseph LaCroix, a developer, had his  of land north of Pines Boulevard annexed to the city. This gave a new pathway to proceed westward. In 1977, a maximum security prison known as the Broward Correctional Institution was built in the northwestern part of town.  This facility closed in 2012. In 1980, property from Flamingo Road to U.S. 27 was incorporated into Pembroke Pines, doubling the size of the city. This expansion included the property that is currently C.B. Smith Park as well as what was once the Hollywood Sportatorium and the Miami-Hollywood Motorsports Park. Also, in 1980, construction began to extend  Interstate 75 from U.S. 27 towards Miami, passing through the new western part of the city. By 1984 the expressway reached  Pines Boulevard, the main east-west arterial road in the city. 

In May 1977, the Grateful Dead put on a storied performance at the Sportatorium. Many Deadheads consider the version of "Sugaree" played during the first set to be the band's—and particularly guitarist Jerry Garcia's—finest performance of the song.

The city's rapid population growth in the mid-to late 1990s was part of the effect of Hurricane Andrew in 1992. Thousands of southern Miami-Dade County residents moved northward to Broward County, many to Pembroke Pines. The resulting boom ranked the City of Pembroke Pines third in a list of "Fastest Growing Cities" in the United States in 1999. The increase in population has increased the need for schools. In 2003, Charles W. Flanagan High School had close to 6,000 students, making it the most populated high school in Florida. In response to Broward County's need to keep up with demands, Mayor Alex Fekete and City Manager Charles Dodge started a charter school system. As of 2006, Pembroke Pines had the largest charter school system in the county. The city is also home to campuses for Broward Community College and Florida International University. The city's population had grown from 65,452 in 1990 to 157,594 in 2011.

In 2001, Pembroke Pines was home to the most dangerous road intersection (Pines Boulevard and Flamingo Road) in the United States, according to State Farm Insurance. City residents passed a bond initiative to allow the city to begin construction to redesign the intersection. The intersection has since been expanded with additional east/west Pines Boulevard lanes.

As developers expanded Pembroke Pines westward, more hurricanes have affected the city and its residents. The western communities, such as Chapel Trail and Silver Lakes, received an estimated . Then in 2004, Hurricane Frances and Jeanne passed to the north (Palm Beach County), but brought tropical storm-force winds and left minor tree and shrub damage. The 2005 hurricane season left a mark on the city. Hurricane Katrina passed directly over the city as a category-one storm. In its wake, it left some damage, such as downed power lines and trees, especially in the Chapel Trail and Silver Lakes developments. In late October, the eye of Hurricane Wilma passed about  toward the north of the city, which saw the strongest winds its residents had experienced in decades. The strongest wind officially recorded in the city was a  sustained wind, with a  wind gust. Most of the city was left without power for days, lights at intersections had been destroyed, a riot at a gas station led to it being closed, most landscaping was destroyed or damaged beyond repair, and minor structural damage (mainly roof and screen damage) occurred. In addition, schools remained closed for two weeks.

Geography

A 2017 study put the city in third place for US cities most vulnerable to coastal flooding, with 116,000 residents living within FEMA's coastal floodplain.

Climate

Pembroke Pines has a tropical monsoon climate (Am) with hot, wet summers and warm, dry winters.

Surrounding areas
 Southwest Ranches, Davie, Cooper City, Hollywood
 The Everglades   Hollywood
 The Everglades   Hollywood
 The Everglades    Hollywood
  Miramar

The area of Pembroke Pines west of Interstate 75 is commonly known as West Pines, and consists mostly of subdivisions built since Hurricane Andrew.

Demographics

2020 census

As of the 2020 United States census, there were 171,178 people, 57,399 households, and 39,823 families residing in the city.

2010 census

As of 2010,  61,703 households were available, with 7.8% of them being vacant. In 2000, 36.2% had children under the age of 18 living with them, 56.4% were married couples living together, 11.1% had a female householder with no husband present, and 29.1% were not families. About 24.1% of all households were made up of individuals, and 12.5% had someone living alone who was 65 years of age or older. The average household size was 2.62 and the average family size was 3.13.

2000 census
In 2000, the city the population was distributed as 25.6% under the age of 18, 6.4% from 18 to 24, 33.5% from 25 to 44, 19.3% from 45 to 64, and 15.2% who were 65 years of age or older. The median age was 36 years. For every 100 females, there were 87.3 males. For every 100 females age 18 and over, there were 81.8 males.

In 2000, the median income for a household in the city was $52,629, and for a family was $61,480. Males had a median income of $45,129 versus $32,531 for females. The per capita income for the city was $23,843. About 3.9% of families and 5.4% of the population were below the poverty line, including 5.2% of those under age 18 and 8.1% of those age 65 or over.

As of 2000, speakers of English as a first language were at 63.06%, while Spanish accounted for 27.91%, French made up 1.24%, French Creole was 0.99%, Portuguese was 0.94%, Italian was at 0.92%, Yiddish at 0.74%, and Tagalog was the mother tongue of 0.52% of the population.

As of 2000, Pembroke Pines had the 45th-highest percentage of Colombian residents in the US, at 3% of the city's population, and the 50th-highest percentage of Cuban residents in the US, at 8.66% of the city's population. It also had the 24th-highest percentage of Jamaicans in the US (tied with Wheatley Heights, New York,) at 5.1% of all residents.

Government
Pembroke Pines has a Commission-Manager form of government. The city commission has five members elected to four-year terms: a mayor elected city-wide and four commissioners elected from four  Single-member districts.

Education
Broward County Public Schools serve Pembroke Pines. In addition, several charter schools are located in Pembroke Pines, and the City of Pembroke Pines operates its own charter school system.

Public schools
High schools
Parts of the city are zoned to Everglades High School and Miramar High School in Miramar and McArthur High School in Hollywood.
 Charles W. Flanagan High School
 West Broward High School

Middle schools
Parts of the city are zoned to Apollo Middle School and Driftwood Middle School in Hollywood and Glades Middle School and New Renaissance Middle School in Miramar.
 Pines Middle School
 Silver Trail Middle School
 Walter C. Young Middle School

Elementary schools
Parts of the city are zoned to Boulevard Heights Elementary School and Sheridan Park Elementary School in Hollywood, Hawkes Bluff Elementary School in Davie, Manatee Bay Elementary School in Weston, and Miramar Elementary School, Silver Lakes Elementary School, Silver Shores Elementary School, Sunset Lakes Elementary School, and Sunshine Elementary School in Miramar.

Charter schools

 Pembroke Pines Charter High School
 Somerset Academy Charter High School
 Pembroke Pines Charter Middle School (Central, West, and Academic Village)
 Franklin Academy Charter School [K–8]
 Renaissance Charter Schools at Pines [K–8]
 Somerset Academy Charter Middle School
 Atlantic Montessori Charter School
 Franklin Academy Charter School [K–8]
 Greentree Preparatory Charter School
 Pembroke Pines Charter Elementary School (East, Central, West, and Florida State University campus)
 Renaissance Charter Schools at Pines [K–8]
 Somerset Academy Charter Elementary School

Higher education
 Florida Career College Pembroke Pines Campus
 The Broward-Pines Center regional campus of Barry University
 The Broward-Pines Center regional campus of Broward College
 The Broward-Pines Center regional campus of Florida International University
 The South regional campus of Broward College
 Keiser University Pembroke Pines Campus

Infrastructure

Transportation

Airports

For scheduled commercial service, Pembroke Pines is primarily served by nearby Fort Lauderdale–Hollywood International Airport and Miami International Airport. The city itself is home to North Perry Airport, a general aviation airport owned by the Broward County Aviation Department.

Public transportation
Local bus service is provided by Broward County Transit. The city also partners with Broward County Transit to provide additional bus routes within the city limits.

Major expressways
  Interstate 75
  Florida's Turnpike (SR 91)

Other major roads
  U.S. 27
   University Drive
   Pines Boulevard
   Sheridan Street
   Flamingo Road
   Pembroke Road

Street grid
Streets in Pembroke Pines are numbered as a continuation of the street grid of neighboring Hollywood; streets are distinguished from those of Hollywood itself by adding a 'west' to the cardinal direction. Streets north of Pines Boulevard are labeled 'northwest' and those south of Pines Boulevard are labeled 'southwest'.

Notable people

 Eric Alejandro, Olympic hurdler
 Jim Alers, aka "The Beast", fighter, UFC veteran, bare-knuckle boxer
 Kenny Anderson, former NBA player
 Baby Ariel, social media personality, singer, and actress
 Geno Atkins, defensive lineman for NFL's Cincinnati Bengals
 Kodak Black, rapper
 Ethan Bortnick, pianist, singer, composer, actor, one of the world's youngest philanthropists
 Bridget Carey, technology journalist
 Triston Casas, baseball player for the Boston Red Sox
 Conceited, rapper and cast member on Wild 'n Out
 Danny Farquhar, Major League Baseball (MLB) player for Tampa Bay Rays (former resident)
 Jeff Fiorentino, MLB player for the Baltimore Orioles (former resident)
 Shayne Gostisbehere, defenseman for the NHL's Carolina Hurricanes
 David Hess, MLB pitcher for the Miami Marlins
Maurice Kemp (born 1991), basketball player in the Israeli Basketball Premier League
 Sofia Kenin, tennis player, winner of the 2020 Australian Open
 Mike Napoli, MLB player for the Cleveland Indians
Joe Perez, MLB player for the Houston Astros
 Chase Priskie, NHL player for the Florida Panthers
 Lil Pump, rapper
 Omar Raja, founder of House of Highlights
 Manny Ramírez, retired MLB player
 Juan Sebastián Restrepo, Army medic killed in Afghanistan; resident from 1999–2006
 Fernando Rodney, relief pitcher for the Washington Nationals
 Lawrence Taylor, former NFL star for the New York Giants
 Niki Taylor, model
 Vince Taylor, professional bodybuilder
 Bella Thorne, actress and model
 Touki Toussaint, MLB player for the Atlanta Braves
 Mike White, quarterback for the NFL's Miami Dolphins
 Walter C. Young, Florida businessman and legislator
 Mark Vientos, MLB player for the New York Mets 
 David Villar, MLB player for the San Francisco Giants

References

External links
 
 
 City of Pembroke Pines official website

 
Cities in Broward County, Florida
Cities in Florida
1959 establishments in Florida
Populated places established in 1959